Mike Wooten may refer to:

Mike Wooten (trooper), Alaska State trooper tied to the Sarah Palin Public Safety Commissioner dismissal
Mike Wooten (American football) (born 1962), American football player